Galewice  is a village in central Poland in Wieruszów County, Łódź Voivodeship, established in the 15th century. It was first mentioned in 1458 in Judicial Chronicles. The origin of the name Galewice is ambiguous. It either comes from a word Gal, which means 'to serve' or it belonged to the first owners of the village, an aristocratic family of Galewski (coat of arms Wierusz). It is the seat of the administrative district of Gmina Galewice.

History and Government 

Galewice was first mentioned in 1458 in Judicial Chronicles and was owned by an aristocratic family of Galewski (coat of arms Wierusz). According to the statistics for the years 1633-1635 Galewice was the second most important settlement on the ancient route between Ostrzeszów and Wieruszów. When Poland was partitioned in 1795 Galewice fell under the Russian occupation. In 1815 it became part of the Congress Poland. Until 1885 the village was owned by the Myszkowski family, when it was bought by Kazimierz Czapski. The Czapski family held the court in Galewice and owned most of the village until the World War II in 1939.

After 1918, when Poland gained independence, Galewice became the host of Gmina Galewice and in 1933 Roman Catholic Church parish (Parafia p.w. Najswietszego Serca Pana Jezusa / the Holiest Heart of Lord Jesus Parish) was established. During World War II it was the place of a labour camp for Jews from Wieruszów County.

Since the Second World War Galewice has remained the seat of Gmina Galewice, firstly in the Łódź Voivodeship, and between 1975-1998 as part of the Kalisz Voivodeship. After the reforms of the units of administrative division and local government in 1998, Galewice has returned to the Łódź Voivodeship.

Galewice comprises two sołectwos: Galewice and Galewice A.

Education 

Szkoła Podstawowa w Galewicach (Primary School in Galewice) dates its roots back to the years 1815-1819 when the village authority began to provide some elementary education for children. They were taught in Russian until 1 November 1905 when the Russian government agreed to teach Polish children in their mother tongue. Primary School in Galewice was suspended during the second world war and reopened in Autumn 1945. Between 1945 and 1972 Primary School in Galewice had a site in the old Czapski Family court and moved to the newly built premises at 22 Konopnickiej Street in February 1972.

Head Teachers:

ca. 1919 - Mr Kątny

ca. 1920 - 1927 - Mr A. Hampel

1927 - 1937 - Mr Jan Maślanka

1937 - 1939 - Mr Ratajek

1946 - 1970 - Mr Władysław Banaszkiewicz

1971 - Mr Ireneusz Kopacki

1971 - 1973 - Mr Boleslaw Petalas

1973 - 1984 - Mr Longin Matyja

1984 - 1986 - Mr Bogusław Smoleński

1986 - 1990 – Mrs Helena Zdunek

1990 - 1994 – Mr Włodzimierz Malinowski

April 1994r - October 1994 – Mrs Joanna Kowalczyk

November 1994 - 2021 - Mrs Beata Kołodziejczyk

2021 - Mrs Izabela Zimoch-Piaskowska

Gimnazjum im. Jana Pawla II w Galewicach (John Paul II Junior High School in Galewice) was established as Junior High School by the Commune Council decree in 1999 and teaches children between 13 and 16 years old. It shares premises with Primary School in Galewice at 22 Konopnickiej Street. In 2005 it obtained its present name.

Head Teachers:

1999–2019 - Mr Piotr Mazurek

Culture and Sport 

In the mid-nineteenth century Antoni Myszkowski built on a hill a neo-classicist court and established a Court Park with trees, such as Robinia pseudoacacia, Douglas fir, Carpinus betulus, Populus alba, and Blue spruce. The court after the Second World War became the host to the primary school and most recently to the nursery. In 2012 a major restoration of the court park was carried out, with new pathways laid out and street lightning fitted in.

The most popular sporting activity in Galewice is football. There are two football clubs: 
  LKS Orzeł Galewice - an amateur football club
  Gal-Gaz Galewice - a semi-professional football club with adult and children sections. The children football club is known as UKS Gal-Gaz Galewice.

Cultural life of Galewice revolves around and is mostly organized by the Cultural Centre (Gminny Ośrodek Kultury), the Volunteer Fire Department (Ochotnicza Straż Pożarna), the parish and local schools.

External links 
 
 Orzel Galewice Football Club
 Gal-Gaz Galewice Football Club
 John Paul II Junior High School in Galewice (Gimnazjum)
 Primary School in Galewice 
 Gminny Ośrodek Kultury in Galewice

Villages in Wieruszów County